"Bad Habits" is a song by Australian singer-songwriter Billy Field. It was released in April 1981 as his debut single and as the lead single from his first studio album of the same name. The song peaked at number four in Australia and number one in New Zealand.

Track listing
7-inch single
A. "Bad Habits" – 3:26
B. "You'll Call It Love" – 4:25

Charts

Weekly charts

Year-end charts

References

1981 debut singles
1981 songs
Number-one singles in New Zealand
Warner Music Group singles